This is a list of notable events in music that took place in the year 1923.

Specific locations
1923 in British music
1923 in Norwegian music

Specific genres
1923 in country music
1923 in jazz

Events
February – Joseph Samuels' Tampa Blue Jazz Band records the George Washington Thomas number "The Fives" for Okeh Records, considered the first example of jazz band boogie-woogie.
February 19 – Jean Sibelius conducts the world première of his Symphony No. 6 in Helsinki.
May 30 – The British Broadcasting Company's Cardiff station (5WA) broadcasts the first full performance of a new orchestral opera on UK radio.
October 18 – Igor Stravinsky conducts the premiere of his Octet at the Paris Opera. In the same concert, Serge Prokofiev's First Violin Concerto (1917) is also premiered, with Marcel Darrieux, violin, and the Paris Opera Orchestra conducted by Serge Koussevitzky.
November 11 – Première of John Foulds's A World Requiem (composed 1919–21) at the Royal Albert Hall in London. It is repeated on that date each year until 1926.
November 19 – At a concert celebrating the 50th anniversary of the union of Buda and Pest (thus creating Budapest), Béla Bartók's Dance Suite and Zoltán Kodály's Psalmus Hungaricus both receive their world premieres
 Explosion of recordings of African American musicians; Bessie Smith, Ida Cox, Joe "King" Oliver, Louis Armstrong, Jelly Roll Morton, Sidney Bechet, many others make their first recordings.
George Enescu makes his debut as a conductor with the Philadelphia Orchestra in New York City.
Henri Pawl-Pleyel, Roger Désormière, Maxime Jacob and Henri Sauguet form the Ecole d'Arcueil.
Augustus John completes his portrait of cellist Guilhermina Suggia.
Japanese composer Michio Miyagi introduces an 80-string koto or "or hachijugen". It proves less popular than the 17-string koto he had invented two years earlier.

Publications
Stewart Macpherson – Melody and Harmony, Books 2 and 3. London: Stainer & Bell. (Book 1 published 1920.)

Published popular music

 "Annabelle" w. Lew Brown m. Ray Henderson
 "Back To Croa-Jingo-Long" w.m. Pat Dunlop
 "Bambalina" w. Otto Harbach & Oscar Hammerstein II m. Herbert Stothart & Vincent Youmans.  Introduced by Edith Day in the musical Wildflower
 "Barney Google" w.m. Billy Rose & Con Conrad
 "Beside A Babbling Brook" w. Gus Kahn m. Walter Donaldson
 "Charleston" w.m. Cecil Mack & James P. Johnson.  Inspiration for a dance craze.
 "Chimes Blues" m. Joe "King" Oliver
 "Come On, Spark Plug!" w.m. Billy Rose & Con Conrad
 "Covered Wagon Days" w.m. Will Morrisey & Joe Burrows
 "Dippermouth Blues" m. Joe "King" Oliver
 "Dizzy Fingers" m. Zez Confrey
 "Frasquita Serenade" m. Franz Lehár
 "Gulf Coast Blues" w.m. Clarence Williams
 "Horsey, Keep Your Tail Up" w.m. Walter Hirsch & Bert Kaplan
 "I Cried For You" w. Arthur Freed m. Gus Arnheim & Abe Lyman
 "I Love Life" w. Irwin M. Cassel m. Mana-Zucca
 "I Love You" w. Harlan Thompson m. Harry Archer.  Introduced by John Boles and Margaret Wilson in the musical Little Jessie James
 "I Won't Say I Will But I Won't Say I Won't" w. B. G. De Sylva & Ira Gershwin m. George Gershwin.  Introduced by Irene Bordoni in the play Little Miss Bluebeard
 "I'm Goin' South" w.m. Abner Silver & Harry Woods
 "I'm Sitting Pretty In A Pretty Little City" w.m. Lou Davis, Henry Santly & Abel Baer
 "Indiana Moon" w. Benny Davis m. Isham Jones
 "It Ain't Gonna Rain No Mo'" w.m. Wendell Hall
 "I've Got The Yes! We Have No Bananas Blues" w. Lew Brown m. James F. Hanley & Robert King
 "Just A Girl That Men Forget" w. Al Dubin & Fred Rath m. Joe Garron
 "Just One More Chance" m. Steiger
 "King Porter Stomp" m. Ferdinand "Jelly Roll" Morton
 "Last Night On The Back Porch" w. Lew Brown m. Carl Schraubstader
 "Linger Awhile" w. Harry Owens m. Vincent Rose
 "Louisville Lou" w. Jack Yellen m. Milton Ager
 "Mama Goes Where Papa Goes" w. Jack Yellen m. Milton Ager
 "Mama Loves Papa" w.m. Cliff Friend & Abel Baer
 "March Of The Cameron Men" w.m. Campbell
 "Mexicali Rose" w. Helen Stone m. Jack B. Tenney
 "Milenberg Joys" m. Leon Rappolo, Paul Mares & Jelly Roll Morton
 "Mon Paradis (Sérénade d'Aujourd'hui)" m. Cuthbert Clarke
 "Moon Love" w. George Grossmith Jr. & P. G. Wodehouse m. Jerome Kern
 "My Sweetie Went Away" w. Roy Turk m. Lou Handman
 "Nashville Nightingale" w. Irving Caesar m. George Gershwin
 "No, No, Nora" w. Gus Kahn m. Ted Fio Rito & Ernie Erdman
 "Nobles of the Mystic Shrine" John Philip Sousa
 "Nobody Knows You When You're Down and Out" w.m. Jimmy Cox
 "Oh Didn't It Rain" w.m. Eddie Leonard
 "Oh Gee Oh Gosh Oh Golly I'm In Love" w. Ole Olsen & Chic Johnson m. Ernest Breuer
 "Oklahoma Indian Jazz" (w. & m.) Ray Hibbler, T.J. Johnsen, J.W. Barna, J.W. Murrin, and T. Guarini
 "Old Fashioned Love" w. Cecil Mack m. James P. Johnson
 "Old King Tut" w. William Jerome m. Harry Von Tilzer
 "On The Mall" m. Edwin Franko Goldman
 "Once In A Blue Moon" w. Anne Caldwell m. Jerome Kern
 "An Orange Grove In California" w.m. Irving Berlin
 "Out Where The Blue Begins" Graff, McHugh, Grant
 "(Home In) Pasadena" w.m. Harry Warren, Grant Clarke & Edgar Leslie
 "Raggedy Ann" w. Anne Caldwell m. Jerome Kern
 "Rememb'ring" w.m. Vivian Duncan & Rosetta Duncan
 "La Rosita" w. Allan Stuart m. Paul Dupont (Pseud. of Walter Haenschen)
 "Seven Or Eleven" w. Lew Brown m. Walter Donaldson
 "Sittin' In A Corner" w. Gus Kahn m. George W. Meyer
 "Sleep" w.m. Earl Lebieg
 "A Smile Will Go A Long Long Way" w. Benny Davis m. Harry Akst
 "Snake Rag" m. King Oliver
 "Sobbin' Blues" w.m. Art Kassel
 "Some Sweet Day" w. Gene Buck m. Dave Stamper & Louis A. Hirsch
 "Stella" w.m. Al Jolson, Benny Davis & Harry Akst
 "Swingin' Down the Lane" w. Gus Kahn m. Isham Jones
 "Tell Me With A Melody" w.m. Irving Berlin
 "That Old Gang of Mine" w. Billy Rose & Mort Dixon m. Ray Henderson
 "Tin Roof Blues" m. Paul Mares, Walter Melrose, Ben Pollack, Mel Stitzel, George Brunies & Leon Roppolo
 "Waitin' For The Evenin' Mail" Billy Baskette
 "When Clouds Have Vanished And Skies Are Blue" w. William R. Clay m. Charles L. Johnson
 "When It's Night-Time In Italy, It's Wednesday Over Here" w.m. James Kendis & Lew Brown
 "When June Comes Along With A Song" w.m. George M. Cohan from the musical The Rise Of Rosie O'Reilly
 "When You Walked Out Someone Else Walked Right In" w.m. Irving Berlin
 "Who'll Buy My Violets" w. E. Ray Goetz m. Jose Padilla
 "Who's Sorry Now?" w. Bert Kalmar & Harry Ruby m. Ted Snyder
 "Wild Flower" w. Otto Harbach & Oscar Hammerstein II m. Vincent Youmans & Herbert Stothart
 "Wolverine Blues" w.m. Ferdinand "Jelly Roll" Morton, Benjamin Spikes & John C. Spikes
 "Yes! We Have No Bananas" w.m. Frank Silver & Irving Cohn
 "You Can't Do What My Last Man Did" w.m. J. C. Johnson & Allie Moore
 "You've Got To See Mama Ev'ry Night" w.m. Con Conrad & Billy Rose

Top popular recordings of 1923

The following songs achieved the highest positions in Joel Whitburn's Pop Memories 1890-1954 and record sales reported on the "Discography of American Historical Recordings" website during 1923.
Numerical rankings are approximate; they are only used as a frame of reference.

Other important recordings
"Dippermouth Blues" by King Oliver's Creole Jazz Band
"High Society" by King Oliver's Creole Jazz Band
"Milenburg Joys" by the New Orleans Rhythm Kings with Jelly Roll Morton
"Wild Cat Blues/Kansas City Man Blues" by Clarence Williams Blue 5, featuring Sidney Bechet

Classical music
Béla Bartók – Dance Suite
Ferruccio Busoni – Prélude et étude en arpèges, BV 297
Henry Cowell – Aeolian Harp
Frederick Delius – Hassan, RT I/9, incidental music for play premiering June 1 in Darmstadt
Gerald Finzi – A Severn Rhapsody
Gabriel Fauré – Piano Trio in D minor, Op. 120
Josef Matthias Hauer – Atonale Musik, Op.20
Paul Hindemith – String Quartet No.5, Op.32, premiered October 26 in Vienna
Jenö Hubay – 5 Konzertetüden, Op.115
Joseph Jongen – 3 Études de concert, Op.65
Sigfrid Karg-Elert 
Cathedral Windows, Op.106
3 Compositions for Organ, Op.108
Darius Milhaud – La création du monde (ballet)
Hans Pfitzner – Concerto for Violin in B minor
Arnold Schoenberg
Fünf Stücke [Five Pieces] for Piano, Op. 23 (1920/1923)
Serenade, Op. 24 (1920/1923)
Suite for Piano, Op. 25 (1921/1923)
Jean Sibelius – Symphony No. 6 was premiered by the Helsinki Philharmonic Orchestra, conducted by the composer, on 19 February 1923
Igor Stravinsky – Octet for Wind Instruments
Germaine Tailleferre – Ballade for Piano and Orchestra; Concerto No. 1 for Piano and Orchestra
Joaquín Turina – Jardin de Oriente
Edgard Varèse
Hyperprism (1922–23)
Octandre
Heitor Villa-Lobos – Nonet ("Impressão rápida de todo o Brasil")
William Walton – Toccata for Violin and Piano
Leó Weiner – Concertino for Piano and Orchestra
Alexander von Zemlinsky – Lyric Symphony

Opera
Alfred Bruneau – Le Jardin du paradis
Hans Gál – Die heilige Ente
Franz Grillparzer - König Ottokars Glück und Ende (written 1923, premiered February 19, 1825 in Vienna's Burgtheater).
Reynaldo Hahn – Ciboulette
Joaquín Turina – Jardin de Oriente

Jazz

Musical theater
 The Beauty Prize (Music: Jerome Kern Lyrics and Book: P. G. Wodehouse and George Grossmith).  London production opened at the Winter Garden Theatre on September 5 and ran for 214 performances
 Catherine London production opened at the Gaiety Theatre on September 22 and ran for 217 performances
 The Cousin from Nowhere London production opened at Prince's Theatre on February 24 and ran for 105 performances
 Dover Street to Dixie London revue opened at the Pavilion on May 31 and ran for 108 performances
 George White's Scandals of 1923 Broadway revue opened at the Globe Theatre on June 18 and transferred to the Fulton Theatre on November 5 for a total run of 168 performances
 Head over Heels London production opened at the Adelphi Theatre on September 8 and ran for 113 performances
 Katinka London production opened at the Shaftesbury Theatre on August 30 and ran for 108 performances
 Kid Boots Broadway production opened at the Earl Carroll Theatre on December 31 and transferred to the Selwyn Theatre on September 1, 1924 for a total run of 489 performances
 Little Nellie Kelly London production opened at the New Oxford Theatre on July 2 and ran for 265 performances
 London Calling! London revue opened at the Duke of York's Theatre on September 4 and ran for 367 performances
 Madame Pompadour
Vienna production opened at the Carltheater on March 2
London production opened at Daly's Theatre on December 20 and ran for 467 performances
 The Music Box Revue London revue opened at the Palace Theatre on May 15 and ran for 217 performances
 The Rainbow London production opened at the Empire Theatre on April 3 and ran for 113 performances
 Rats London revue opened at the Vaudeville Theatre on February 4 and ran for 285 performances
 The Rise of Rosie O'Reilly Broadway production opened at the Liberty Theatre on December 25 and ran for 97 performances
"Runnin' Wild', Broadway musical with music by James P. Johnson and Cecil Mack opened October 29 and ran at the new Colonial Theatre for 228 performances. Spearheaded the Charleston dance craze.
 Stop Flirting London production opened at the Shaftesbury Theatre on May 30 and ran for 418 performances
 Wildflower Broadway production opened at the Casino Theatre on February 7 and ran for 477 performances
 The Jilts by Philip Barry, won the Herndon Prize in 1922 as the best drama. Renamed You and I, the play opened on Broadway on February 19, 1923,
 You'd Be Surprised London production opened at the Royal Opera House on January 27 and ran for 270 performances
 Ziegfeld Follies of 1923 Broadway revue opened at the New Amsterdam Theatre on October 20 and ran for 233 performances

Births
January 1 – Milt Jackson, jazz vibraphonist (d. 1999)
January 4
Don Butterfield, classical and jazz tuba player (d. 2006)
Tito Rodríguez, Puerto Rican-American singer-songwriter and television host (d. 1973)
January 5 – Sam Phillips, record producer (d. 2003)
January 25 – Rusty Draper, American singer-songwriter (d. 2003)
February 2 – Julius Hegyi, American conductor and violinist (d. 2007)
February 5 – Claude King, country singer and songwriter (d. 2013)
March 2 – Doc Watson, guitarist, singer and songwriter (d. 2012)
March 26 – Clifton Williams, composer (d. 1976)
April 25 – Albert King, blues guitarist and singer (d. 1992)
May 15 – John Lanchbery, composer and conductor (d. 2003)
May 17 – Peter Mennin, American composer and administrator (d. 1983)
May 28 – György Ligeti, composer (d. 2006)
June 8 – Karel Goeyvaerts, Belgian composer (d. 1993)
June 29 – Ronnie Ronalde, born Ronald Waldron, English yodeller and siffleur (d. 2015)
July 22 – Mukesh, Bollywood playback singer (d. 1976)
July 31 – Ahmet Ertegun, record industry executive (d. 2006)
August 4 – Arthur Butterworth, English composer (d. 2014)
August 11 – June Hutton, singer (d. 1973)
September 15 – Anton Heiller, Austrian organist, harpsichordist, composer, conductor (d. 1979)
September 17 – Hank Williams, country musician (d. 1953)
October 3 – Stanisław Skrowaczewski, orchestral conductor (d. 2017)
October 5 – Glynis Johns, actress and singer
October 16 – Bert Kaempfert, songwriter and orchestra leader (d. 1980)
October 20 – Robert Craft, conductor and music writer (d. 2015)
October 23 – Ned Rorem, composer and writer (d. 2022)
November 1 – Antonia Apodaca, New Mexican folk musician and composer (d. 2020)
November 2 – Pearl Carr, singer (d. 2020)
November 10 – Anne Shelton, singer (d. 1994)
December 2 – Maria Callas, operatic soprano (d. 1977)

Deaths
January 5 – Emanuel Wirth, violinist (b. 1842)
January 10 – Patsy Touhey, Irish-American piper (b. 1865)
January 18 – Kate Santley, actress and singer (b. 1837)
January 25 – Alfons Petzold, Austrian lyricist (b. 1882)
February 2 – Vassily KW Brandt, composer (b. 1869)
February 19 
Gerónimo Giménez, Spanish composer (b. 1854)
Josef Pembaur, American composer (b. 1848)
February 27 – Léon Roques, translator (b. 1839)
March 5 – Dora Pejačević, composer (b. 1885)
March 8 – Krišjānis Barons, collector of Latvian folk songs (b. 1835)
March 16 – August Göllerich, Austrian conductor (born 1859)
March 20 – Henry Edward Krehbiel, musicologist (b. 1854)
April 17 – Anthony J. Stastny, composer (b. 1885)
May 7 – Sadie Martinot, actress and soprano singer (b. 1861)
May 30 – Camille Chevillard, composer
June 11 – Julia Ettie Crane, music educator (b. 1855)
June 20 
Joseph Leopold Röckel, composer (born 1838)
Charitie Lees Smith, hymn-writer (b. 1841)
June 30 – Claude Terrasse, composer of operettas (b. 1867)
July 10 – Albert Chevalier, English actor, singer, songwriter and music hall performer (b. 1861)
July 13 – Asger Hamerik, composer (b. 1843)
August 15 – Vali von der Osten, operatic soprano (b. 1882)
August 31 – Ernest van Dyck, operatic tenor (b. 1861)
October 11 – Wilhelm Karczag, theater director (born 1857)
October 12 – John Cadvan Davies, poet and hymn-writer (b. 1846)
October 14 – George Elbridge Whiting, composer (born 1840)
October 22 – Victor Maurel, operatic baritone (b. 1848)
October 28 – Theodor Reuss, music hall singer and polymath (b. 1855)
December 2 – Tomás Bretón, composer (b. 1850)
December 7 – Vess Ossman, banjoist (b. 1868)
December 19 – Gustav Dannreuther, violinist and conductor (b. 1853)
date unknown
Charles Jean Baptiste Collin-Mezin, violin-maker (b. 1841)
Joseph Pothier, musicologist, reviver of the Gregorian chant (b. 1835)

References

 
20th century in music
Music by year